The Diocese of Hearst–Moosonee is a Latin Church ecclesiastical territory or diocese of the Catholic Church in Ontario. The diocese was erected on 3 December 2018 through the unification of the Diocese of Hearst and the Diocese of Moosonee. The Diocese of Hearst evolved from the Prefecture Apostolic of Northern Ontario erected on 18 April 1919. The Diocese of Hearst–Moonosee is a suffragan diocese in the ecclesiastical province of the metropolitan Archdiocese of Ottawa-Cornwall.

History
The territory that would form the diocese was elevated to an apostolic vicariate on 17 November 1920.

Ordinaries
Joseph-Jean-Baptiste Hallé (1918 - 1939)
Joseph Charbonneau (1939 - 1940), appointed Coadjutor Archbishop of Montréal, Québec
Albini LeBlanc (1940 - 1945), appointed Bishop of Gaspé, Québec
Georges-Léon Landry (1946 - 1952)
Louis Lévesque (1952 - 1964), appointed Coadjutor Archbishop of Rimouski, Québec
Jacques Landriault (1964 - 1971),  appointed Bishop of Timmins, Ontario
Roger-Alfred Despatie (1973 - 1993)
Pierre Fisette, P.M.E. (1993 - 1995)
André Vallée, P.M.E. (1996 - 2005)
Vincent Cadieux, O.M.I. (2007 - 2016)
He continued as Bishop of Moosonee, a position he had held since 1991. This appointment joined the two dioceses only through him, in persona episcopi, but did not create a single diocesan administration.
Robert Bourgon (2016 - 2020)
Terrence Prendergast, S.J. (2020 - 2022) as Apostolic Administrator
Pierre Olivier Tremblay, O.M.I. (2022 - present)

Territorial losses

References

External links
 Official Site

Hearst